Tiens Group (from ) is a Chinese multinational conglomerate and multi-level marketing company headquartered in Tianjin, China.

The company also operates a manufacturing facility in Vietnam.

History
Tiens Group was founded in 1995 by Li Jinyuan. Tiens entered the international market in 1997. The company's initial product offerings included traditional Chinese medicinal products, calcium tablets, and instant coffee. In 2008, they reported having 12 million MLM distributors worldwide, including more than 40,000 in Germany, and 40 million customers, mostly in Russia, with approximately 60,000 in Germany. In 2014, they reported having 200,000 distributors in Uganda. The company also has market partners in Indonesia, Hungary and Kazakhstan.

In May 2015, the company sent 6,400 employees on a four-day tour of France. While in Nice, they set a Guinness World Record for the longest "human-made phrase".

Controversy

United States
	
In September 2016, the FDA issued an advisory letter warning them that their claim of treating or preventing "asthma, cancer, rheumatism, diabetes, cardiovascular diseases, myocardial infarction, stroke, sexually transmitted diseases (e.g., herpes), cerebral embolism, and dementia" violates the Federal Food, Drug, and Cosmetic Act. As of December 2022, the FDA still lists Tiens products among "Products Illegally Marketed for Serious Diseases". These include TIENS Super Calcium with Lecithin, TIENS Selenium Supplement, TIENS Natto Ginkgo, TIENS Cell Rejuvenation Yi Kang, TIENS Cordyceps, and TIENS Wei Kang Vitality.

Bangladesh

Tiens has been the subject of controversy in Bangladesh, where the company is known as Tianshi. According to local news reports, many people in Bangladesh who invested in Tianshi lost their money, and they claimed that the products were ineffective and priced 4 to 20 times higher than comparable products from well known retailers. 

In 2015, the Government of Bangladesh banned all types of domestic and foreign MLM trade in Bangladesh including Tiens.

Between 2017 and 2018, the company secretly left the country after embezzling hundreds of crores taka from consumers.

Uganda

According to an article in The Guardian, in Uganda, the company's "food supplements" are being touted as cures for everything from cancer and HIV to hernias, tumors, and appendicitis. The report claims that the company is a pyramid scheme, where most of the money is generated from joining fees of new recruits.

Pakistan

In November 2008, Jamia Darul Uloom, Karachi, a seminary headed by the Grand Mufti of Pakistan, issued a Fatwa to the effect that the marketing scheme of Tiens is not permissible. On 3 November 2011, another fatwa was issued about a fake fatwa that was circulating without signatures or stamps, claiming that Jamia Darul Uloom has retracted its previous reservations, and now considers it permissible. The fatwa stated that this is a fake, and the original fatwa has not been altered. M. Mahmood suggested that perhaps the original fatwa was based on a misunderstanding of the economic workings of Tiens, and provided more detailed information about how the multi-level marketing scheme works. He asked for a review of the original fatwa, and on 28 November 2011, a fatwa further reconfirmed that the new facts presented do not substantially change the original decision.

References 

Dagne Tarle Tars- Food Engineering Group(Ethio-Tiens Group)==External links==

 Official website of the Tiens Group
	

1995 establishments in China
Chinese brands
Companies based in Tianjin
Conglomerate companies established in 1995
Companies formerly listed on NYSE American
Conglomerate companies of China
Multinational companies headquartered in China
Multi-level marketing companies
Pharmaceutical companies of China